"Over" is the second single from English electronic music band Portishead's self-titled second album (1997). It peaked at number 25 on the UK Singles Chart and has been used in numerous TV shows and movies. The promotional black-and-white music video directed by Chris Bran featured lead singer Beth Gibbons singing to the camera in the middle of the darkness and occasionally running from one spotlight to another.

Critical reception
British magazine Music Week gave the song three out of five, adding, "Typical of the mood of the parent album, this second spin-off single finds the quartet in very dark emotional waters, though still featuring all the classic Portishead sonic cues. Further listening reaps rewards."

Track list
 Original British CD
"Over"
"Over Remix"
"Over Instrumental"

 British CD "Over 2"
"Over"
"Half Day Closing" (NYC)
"Humming" (NYC)

Personnel

 Beth Gibbons – vocals, production
 Adrian Utley – guitar, bass, production
 Geoff Barrow – drums, samples, turntables, programming, production 
 Dave McDonald – production

Charts

Cover versions 
Ecuadorian electronic duo The Bunnies included a live version of the song in their 2016 eponymous EP.

Musician Steve Adey covered the song on his 2017 LP Do Me a Kindness.

The track was sampled by RZA on the track "Kiss of a Black Widow".

References 

1997 singles
Portishead (band) songs
1997 songs
Go! Discs singles
Songs written by Geoff Barrow
Songs written by Beth Gibbons
Songs written by Adrian Utley